Alife Cathedral (Cattedrale di Santa Maria Assunta) is a Roman Catholic cathedral in Alife in the province of Caserta, Campania, Italy. Dedicated to  the Assumption of the Virgin Mary, it is the seat of the Bishop of Alife-Caiazzo.

Alife Cathedral, first built in 1132, was formerly dedicated to Pope Sixtus I, later Saint Sixtus, the patron saint of the city. After the severe earthquakes of 1456 and 1688, the cathedral was largely rebuilt in Baroque style, and reopened in 1692.

The interior has however maintained noteworthy elements of the Lombard-Norman building, including two arcades decorated with sculptures of animals (including the elephant, heraldic symbol of the city established by the d'Aquino family, who ruled Alife from 1121 to 1269) and saints. Also interesting is the Romanesque crypt, which houses the relics of Saint Sixtus, brought here by Ranulf, Count of Alife: it has a rectangular plan and columns from the ancient Roman theatre. Some of the capitals are ancient, while others are mediaeval copies of the Roman originals.

Sources and external links
 Catholic Encyclopedia: Alife
 Catholic Hierarchy: Diocese of Alife-Caiazzo
 Website of Alife Cathedral

References
 Francesco S. Finelli, 1928: Città di Alife e Diocesi. Scafati
 Angelo Gambella, 2007: Medioevo Alifano. Rome: Drengo
 Gianfrancesco Trutta, 1776: Dissertazioni istoriche delle antichità alifane. Naples

Roman Catholic cathedrals in Italy
Cathedrals in Campania
Churches in the province of Caserta
17th-century Roman Catholic church buildings in Italy
Roman Catholic churches completed in 1692
1132 establishments in Europe
12th-century establishments in Italy